Dave McCloughan is a former cornerback in the National Football League (NFL).

Biography
McCloughan was born David Kent McCloughan on November 20, 1966 in San Leandro, California. His father was Oakland Raiders cornerback, Kent McCloughan, and his brother, Scot McCloughan, is the former general manager of the Washington Redskins.

Career
McCloughan was drafted in the third round of the 1991 NFL Draft by the Indianapolis Colts and spent his first season with the team. He spent the 1992 NFL season with the Green Bay Packers before spending his final two seasons with the Seattle Seahawks. After his playing career, he became a scout for the San Francisco 49ers.

He played at the collegiate level at the University of Colorado at Boulder. While there, he was a member of the 1990 National Championship team.

See also
List of Green Bay Packers players

References

1966 births
Living people
People from San Leandro, California
Players of American football from California
American football cornerbacks
Colorado Buffaloes football players
University of Colorado Boulder alumni
Indianapolis Colts players
Green Bay Packers players
Seattle Seahawks players
Sportspeople from Alameda County, California